Ful or FUL may refer to:
 Fula language
 Fula people
 Ful medames, a fava bean dish of Sudan and Egypt
 Fullerton Municipal Airport, California, United States; IATA code FUL
 Fullerton Transportation Center, California; Amtrak code FUL
 Ful (artist), Cameroonian Singer